Placidochromis is a genus of cichlids endemic to Lake Malawi in Eastern Africa. They are part of the haplochromine lineage of Lake Malawi's cichlid taxa. Most Placidochromis species live in the open or sandy regions of the lake.

Species
There are currently 43 recognized species in this genus:

 Placidochromis acuticeps Hanssens, 2004
 Placidochromis acutirostris Hanssens, 2004
 Placidochromis argyrogaster Hanssens, 2004
 Placidochromis boops Hanssens, 2004
 Placidochromis borealis Hanssens, 2004
 Placidochromis chilolae Hanssens, 2004
 Placidochromis communis Hanssens, 2004
 Placidochromis domirae Hanssens, 2004
 Placidochromis ecclesi Hanssens, 2004
 Placidochromis electra (W. E. Burgess, 1979) (Deepwater Hap)
 Placidochromis elongatus Hanssens, 2004
 Placidochromis fuscus Hanssens, 2004
 Placidochromis hennydaviesae (W. E. Burgess & H. R. Axelrod, 1973)
 Placidochromis intermedius Hanssens, 2004
 Placidochromis johnstoni (Günther, 1894)
 Placidochromis koningsi Hanssens, 2004
 Placidochromis lineatus Hanssens, 2004
 Placidochromis longimanus (Trewavas, 1935)
 Placidochromis longirostris Hanssens, 2004
 Placidochromis longus Hanssens, 2004
 Placidochromis lukomae Hanssens, 2004
 Placidochromis macroceps Hanssens, 2004
 Placidochromis macrognathus Hanssens, 2004
 Placidochromis mbunoides Hanssens, 2004
 Placidochromis milomo M. K. Oliver, 1989 (Super VC-10 Hap)
 Placidochromis minor Hanssens, 2004
 Placidochromis minutus Hanssens, 2004
 Placidochromis msakae Hanssens, 2004
 Placidochromis nigribarbis Hanssens, 2004
 Placidochromis nkhatae Hanssens, 2004
 Placidochromis nkhotakotae Hanssens, 2004
 Placidochromis obscurus Hanssens, 2004
 Placidochromis ordinarius Hanssens, 2004
 Placidochromis orthognathus Hanssens, 2004
 Placidochromis pallidus Hanssens, 2004
 Placidochromis phenochilus (Trewavas, 1935)
 Placidochromis platyrhynchos Hanssens, 2004
 Placidochromis polli (W. E. Burgess & H. R. Axelrod, 1973)
 Placidochromis rotundifrons Hanssens, 2004
 Placidochromis subocularis (Günther, 1894)
 Placidochromis trewavasae Hanssens, 2004
 Placidochromis turneri Hanssens, 2004
 Placidochromis vulgaris Hanssens, 2004

References

 
Haplochromini

Cichlid genera
Taxa named by David Henry Eccles
Taxa named by Ethelwynn Trewavas